New Hempstead is a village in the town of Ramapo, Rockland County, New York, United States. It is located north of New Square, east of Wesley Hills, south of Pomona, and west of New City. The population was 5,132 at the 2010 census.  Residents utilize the Spring Valley and New City post offices.

History 
New Hempstead was incorporated on March 21, 1983.  Joseph Berger of the New York Times said in a 1997 article that New Hempstead was one of several villages formed in Ramapo by non-Jews and more secular Jews "to preserve the sparse Better Homes and Garden ambiance that attracted them to Rockland County."

Geography
New Hempstead is located at  (41.145945, -74.046641).

Demographics

As of the census of 2000, there were 4,767 people, 1,282 households, and 1,160 families residing in the village. The population density was 1,678.8 people per square mile (648.1/km2). There were 1,300 housing units at an average density of 457.8 per square mile (176.7/km2). The racial makeup of the village was 69.96% white, 17.54% African American, .17% Native American, 7.26% Asian, .08% Pacific Islander, 3.06% from other races, and 1.93% from two or more races. Hispanic or Latino of any race were 9.04% of the population.

There were 1,282 households, out of which 48.6% had children under the age of 18 living with them, 81% were married couples living together, 6.6% had a female householder with no husband present, and 9.5% were non-families. 7.4% of all households were made up of individuals, and 2.9% had someone living alone who was 65 years of age or older. The average household size was 3.69 and the average family size was 3.88.

In the village, the population was spread out, with 35.7% under the age of 18, 6.2% from 18 to 24, 26.9% from 25 to 44, 23.2% from 45 to 64, and 8.0% who were 65 years of age or older. The median age was 34 years. For every 100 females, there were 99.9 males. For every 100 females age 18 and over, there were 99 males.

The median income for a household in the village was $95,472, and the median income for a family was $100,127. Males had a median income of $64,013 versus $44,028 for females. The per capita income for the village was $32,917. About 1.2% of families and 4.2% of the population were below the poverty line, including 4.3% of those under age 18 and 1.8% of those age 65 or over.

Government
As of July 2021, the mayor of New Hempstead is Abe Sicker, the deputy mayor is Shalom Mintz, and the trustees are Jennifer Eisenstein, Adam Reich, and Moshe Schulgasser.  The village is located within the East Ramapo School District.

Landmarks and places of interest
 The Brick Church - 220 Brick Church Road - The church was founded by Dutch settlers in 1774 and was once known as the Reformed Church of West New Hempstead. Its present home was built in 1857 with bricks made from clay mined during the heyday of Haverstraw's brick industry. The graves of Revolutionary War soldiers and some original settlers are found in its church yard. Its cemetery building once served as the town hall for Haverstraw and later for Ramapo.  Due to overcrowding in the East Ramapo school district buildings in the 1960s, the district made use of the Brick Church school.  Recently the church celebrated its 150th anniversary. (NRHP)
 The English Meeting House (now the New Hempstead Presbyterian Church) - first English-speaking church west of the Hudson River in New York state.

See also
 Spring Hill VAC

References

External links
 New Hempstead official website

Villages in New York (state)
Villages in Rockland County, New York
1983 establishments in New York (state)